Coptodisca is genus of moths of the family Heliozelidae. It was described by Walsingham in 1895.

Species
 Coptodisca arbutiella (madrone shield bearer)
 Coptodisca cercocarpella (curl-leaf mountain mahogany leafminer)
 Coptodisca condaliae
 Coptodisca diospyriella
 Coptodisca ella
 Coptodisca juglandella
 Coptodisca kalmiella
 Coptodisca lucifluella
 Coptodisca magnella
 Coptodisca matheri
 Coptodisca negligens
 Coptodisca ostryaefoliella
 Coptodisca powellella
 Coptodisca quercicolella
 Coptodisca rhizophorae
 Coptodisca ribesella
 Coptodisca saliciella
 Coptodisca splendoriferella (resplendent shield bearer)

References

Heliozelidae
Adeloidea genera